El Hamawat El Fatenat is a 1954 Egyptian film about a couple who are married, played by Kamal El Shennawy and Kareman, and get into daily arguments and conflicts with each other because they share a roof with their mothers-in-law.

Plot
Samir is a handsome, young man in his mid-twenties. He works in a construction company and marries Nabila, the woman he has always loved.

Only days after their marriage, Nabila’s mother decides to come and live with them in the same house. Samir’s mother feels jealous, and decides she as well should have that “privilege”. Naturally, the two mothers-in-law begin arguing about different things and life at home becomes chaotic. So, Samir (played by Kamal El Shennawy) decides to get a groom for his mother-in-law so she can leave the house. When he finally got her a groom, his mother did her best to try to get Nabila on her side. Again they start fighting over him until Nabila and his mother decide to leave the house and stay away for a few days.

Nabila is pregnant at the time and when she is about to give birth, Samir gets into trouble with his company and ends up in prison for a couple of days. Nabila gives birth, travels to be by his side and leaves her child under the responsibility of her mothers-in-law. When Samir finishes his time in prison, they get the shocking news that a car hit their child. The movie ends with the scene of everyone in the hospital and the mothers-in-law confesses that they are indeed the cause of many of the problems and so they promise to leave them alone in peace.

Cast
 Kamal el-Shennawi as Samir
 Kareman as Nabila
 Ismail Yasin as Bahgat
 Mari Moneeb as Samir's mother
 Mimi Shakeeb as Nabila's mother
 Abd El Salam El Nabulsi

See also

 Ismail Yasin
 Abdel Salam Al Nabulsy
 Cinema of Egypt
 Cinema of Egypt

References

External links

Egyptian comedy-drama films
1954 films
Egyptian black-and-white films
1950s Arabic-language films